Amjad Waqas (born 22 March 1983) is a Pakistani first-class cricketer who played for Abbottabad cricket team.

References

External links
 

1983 births
Living people
Pakistani cricketers
Abbottabad cricketers
People from Haripur District